Hemiolaus is a butterfly genus in the family Lycaenidae.

Species
Hemiolaus caeculus (Hopffer, 1855)
Hemiolaus ceres (Hewitson, 1865)
Hemiolaus cobaltina (Aurivillius, 1899)
Hemiolaus maryra (Mabille, [1887])

External links
Hemiolaus at funet

Hypolycaenini
Lycaenidae genera
Taxa named by Per Olof Christopher Aurivillius